The Nobleman is a 1736 comedy play by Elizabeth Cooper. It premiered at the Haymarket Theatre, and is also known by the longer title The Nobleman, or, The Family Quarrel.

References

Bibliography
 Burling, William J. A Checklist of New Plays and Entertainments on the London Stage, 1700-1737. Fairleigh Dickinson Univ Press, 1992.
 Nicoll, Allardyce. A History of Early Eighteenth Century Drama: 1700-1750. CUP Archive, 1927.

1736 plays
British plays
Comedy plays
West End plays